Le Born is the name of two communes in France:

 Le Born, in the Haute-Garonne department
 Le Born, in the Lozère department